Finding Mercy is a 2013 Nigerian drama film produced and directed by Desmond Elliot, and starring Rita Dominic, Blossom Chukwujekwu, Uti Nwachukwu and Chioma Chukwuka.

Cast
Rita Dominic
Uti Nwachukwu
Chioma Chukwuka-Akpotha
Blossom Chukwujekwu
Tamara Eteimo
Desmond Elliot
Biola Williams
Dabota Lawson
Faith bungie

Reception
Nollywood Reinvented gave it a 56% rating, commending its production and directing. The reviewer found the film interesting in spite of the film's focus on the problems of daily living. Efe Doghudje of 360Nobs gave it a rating of 5 out of 10 stars. She criticized the inadequate costuming that meant that in spite of a strong cast, the characters were not very believable.

See also
 List of Nigerian films of 2013

References

2013 films
2013 drama films
Nigerian drama films
English-language Nigerian films
2010s English-language films